Lechosław "Ola" Olsza (born 28 February 1949) is a Polish former footballer playing as a midfielder and manager. He is primarily associated with two Upper Silesian football clubs; GKS Katowice and GKS Tychy.

Playing career

Club
He brought to GKS Katowice from Zryw Chorzów by Jerzy Nikiel, debuting in a 1-0 win against Stal Rzeszów. In 1971 he was part of the squad that upset FC Barcelona at Camp Nou in 2-0 win. His greatest successes came with GKS Tychy however, winning the vice-championship in 1976, in what was the golden era for the club; this success earned him a call-up to the national team. In 1979 he spent a year with the then Third Division side Rozwój Katowice before emigrating to Austria for 4 years, playing alongside other Poles such as Józef Kwiatkowski and Józef Kurzeja.

International
He played in the 1972 UEFA European Under-23 Championship in a Group 8 match, coming on a substitute against Albania in a 2-1 win on 12 May 1971. He played in two matches for the Poland senior national team in 1976, making his debut against Greece.

Managerial career
In between various non-footballing activities and multiple emigrations from Poland, over the years he has had various roles at GKS Katowice, ranging from first team coach, second coach, assistant manager, manager, director of football, kit man, manual labourer, and stoker.

Personal life
He comes from a sporting family; his father Józef played for Ruch Chorzów, his uncle Kazimierz Pietranek for Stal Sosnowiec. Lechosław's daughter Aleksandra is a former Wimbledon Junior Girls title holder, his wife Barbara a 29-time national tennis champion, and his son a professional sports coach with a doctorate in sports science.

References

External links
 
 

1949 births
Living people
Polish footballers
Poland international footballers
GKS Tychy players
GKS Katowice players
Rozwój Katowice players
GKS Katowice managers
People from Sosnowiec
Association footballers not categorized by position